Marian Filar is the name of:

Marian Filar (pianist), Polish pianist
Marian Filar (politician), Polish politician